John Richardson (born 4 October 1944) is a Canadian rower. He competed in the men's coxed eight event at the 1968 Summer Olympics.

References

1944 births
Living people
Canadian male rowers
Olympic rowers of Canada
Rowers at the 1968 Summer Olympics
Sportspeople from Leeds
Pan American Games medalists in rowing
Pan American Games silver medalists for Canada
Rowers at the 1967 Pan American Games
Rowers at the 1979 Pan American Games